was a Japanese scriptwriter. She is known particularly for writing the NHK Asadora Oshin, and was considered Japan's most successful TV drama scriptwriter. She established Hashida Cultural Foundation.

Life
Hashida was born in Keijō (present-day Seoul) in 1925 while Korea was under Japanese rule. She moved to Sakai City in Japan with her mother while she was still young. Sugako began studying Japanese literature at Japan Women's College in Tokyo in 1942 but her education was interrupted by World War II. Although her family had lost its savings, she was able later to continue her education, transferring to the Department of Art at Waseda University. Hashida acknowledged that she discovered the work of Kikuchi Kan during her studies and these were a substantial influence on her later work. After completing her studies, she found work in the script department of Shochiku. She was laid off in 1960 but continued to write scripts on a freelance basis and supplemented her income by writing short stories for girls' magazines. In 1965, she married Hiroshi Iwasaki, a producer for the Tokyo Broadcasting System.

In 1973, she wrote the script for the television drama Ai to Shi o Mitsumete. This was followed by other successful scripts: the series Tonari no Shibafu (1976–77), Oshin (1983–84), Fūfu (1979), Michi (1980), Onnatachi no Chuushingura (1981) and Dakazoku (1983). An English-dubbed version of Tonari no Shibafu, The Grass Is Greener on the Other Side, was shown on American cable during the early 1980s.

Oshin, a  serialised morning TV drama or asadora, was the first asadora to be both produced and written by women in Japan. Hashida is known particularly for writing Oshin, but she can be considered Japan's most successful TV drama script writer. Oshin was broadcast throughout Asia and became one of Japan's most famous television dramas. The series was developed from Hashida's original script.

Awards
Hashida received the Broadcasting Culture Award, the Golden Arrow and the Most Distinguished Individual Achievement Award in 1979. Four years later she received the Cultural Achievement Award in Broadcasting and the Kikuchi Kan Award.

In 2020, she received the Order of Culture.

References

External links 
 

1925 births
2021 deaths
Japanese screenwriters
Japanese women writers
Recipients of the Medal with Purple Ribbon
People from Seoul
Recipients of the Order of the Sacred Treasure, 3rd class
Persons of Cultural Merit
Recipients of the Order of Culture